Cha Ung is a commune in Ou Chum District in north-east Cambodia. It contains Char Ung Ket, Char Ung Chan, Phlay Ampil, Thuoy Tum, Char Ung Kao villages and has a population of 1,733. In the 2007 commune council elections, all five seats went to members of the Cambodian People's Party. The land alienation rate in Cha Ung was moderate as of January 2006. (See Ratanakiri Province for background information on land alienation.)

Villages

References

Communes of Ratanakiri province